Gavin Cowan may refer to:

 Gavin Cowan (footballer) (born 1981), German-born English footballer
 Gavin Cowan (rugby league) (born 1987), rugby league player